Endeavor Streaming is a digital video technology company headquartered in Plainview, New York, USA.  Founded in 2004 as NeuLion, the company was acquired in 2018 by sports and entertainment company, Endeavor, and rebranded Endeavor Streaming.  The company specializes in digital video broadcasting, distribution, and monetization of live and on-demand content, to Internet-enabled devices.

History 
 2004: NeuLion was founded as a privately held technology company.  Key founders included Charles Wang and his wife, Nancy Li. 
 October 2008: NeuLion finalized a merger with Internet streaming company JumpTV, combining technology and client partnerships in sports, international and variety programming.
 July 2009: JumpTV Inc. changed its name to NeuLion, Inc. and continued trading on the Toronto Stock Exchange under the new name and new symbol NLN.  
 November 2009: NeuLion acquired Vancouver based webcasting company Interactive Netcasting Systems Inc.("INSINC") which held among other properties, eight North American based hockey leagues.
 October 2010: the NeuLion closed an acquisition of TransVideo International.  TransVideo is a Chinese-based IPTV technology provider and a manufacturer of set top boxes utilized by the company.  
 February 2015: NeuLion acquired DivX, Inc., a digital video technology developer. Kanaan Jemili, former DivX CEO became CEO of NeuLion.
 June 2016: NeuLion acquired Saffron Digital, a UK-based company building multi-platform digital video services for entertainment delivered over-the-top to internet connected devices. Roy Reichbach was promoted from General Counsel to President and CEO, replacing Kanaan Jemili.
 December 2017: NeuLion reached an agreement with an affiliate of Fortress Investment Group to sell certain DivX assets, IP and subsidiaries. 
 February 2018: NeuLion closes transaction with an affiliate of Fortress Investment Group to sell certain DivX assets, intellectual property and subsidiaries for cash consideration of $41.5 million.
 March 2018: NeuLion entered into an agreement to be acquired by sports and entertainment leader Endeavor in an all-cash deal valued at approximately USD $250 million. Upon completion of the transaction, NeuLion will become a privately held subsidiary of Endeavor.
 May 2018: NeuLion announced the closing of its acquisition by sports and entertainment leader Endeavor.

Services 
Endeavor Streaming’s technology and services include multi-screen video delivery solutions, consumer electronics licensing, professional content tools and consumer software.

NeuLion Digital Platform: The NeuLion Digital Platform is an end-to-end video streaming platform providing licensed components from content ingestion, encoding and management to content security, monetization and monitoring, as well as app development across all major connected devices. The platform facilitates the streaming and distribution of premium sports and entertainment content. NeuLion Digital Platform customers include the NBA, NFL, Univision, UFC, Big Ten Network, English Football League, Sky Sports and others.

Consumer Electronics Licensing: The NeuLion CE SDK allows consumer electronics manufacturers to deploy devices that can support video streaming in up to 4K (at 4Kp60 through leveraging HEVC MPEG-DASH).  The SDK is currently licensed by Samsung Electronics, Sony, LG Electronics, and others.

MainConcept Tools: Under its MainConcept brand, NeuLion provides professional content tools and technologies including Codecs, HEVC, Transcoding, and Mobile SDKs directly to customers in broadcast, video production, security, multimedia, and more.

Other Services: NeuLion has partnered with Univision and NBA to trial live 4K streaming events. UFC 205 was the first globally available pay-per-view event to be live streamed in 4K.

Key Markets: Broadcasters, Operators, Sports Leagues and Teams, Sports Networks, Colleges and Conferences, Content Rights Holders, CE, Service Providers, Video Production, OTT Services and Consumers.

References

External links
 

Mass media companies of the United States
Companies formerly listed on the Toronto Stock Exchange